NA-6 Lower Dir-I is a constituency for the National Assembly of Pakistan. The area was formerly part of NA-34 (Lower Dir) constituency  from 1977 to 2018. The delimitation in 2018 split Lower Dir into two separate constituencies, NA-6 (Lower Dir-I) and NA-7 (Lower Dir-II).

Members of Parliament

Since 2018: NA-6 (Lower Dir-I)

2018 general election 

General elections were held on 25 July 2018.

†JI and JUI-F contested as part of MMA

By-election 2023 
A by-election will be held on 19 March 2023 due to the resignation of Mehboob Shah, the previous MNA from this seat.

See also
NA-5 Upper Dir
NA-7 Lower Dir-II

References 

6
6